Philip Robert Cousineau (born 1952) is an American author, lecturer, independent scholar, screenwriter, and documentary filmmaker. He lives in San Francisco, California.

Early life and education 

Phil Cousineau was born on 26 November 1952 in Columbia, South Carolina. He grew up just outside Detroit, with French Canadian roots. He studied journalism at the University of Detroit.

Career
Before turning to writing books and films full-time, Cousineau’s peripatetic career also included playing semi-professional basketball in Europe, harvesting date trees on an Israeli kibbutz, painting 44 Victorian houses (also known as Painted Ladies in San Francisco), teaching, and leading art and literary tours to Europe. He has worked as a sportswriter and taught screenwriting at the American Film Institute (AFI).

American mythologist Joseph Campbell was a mentor and major influence; Cousineau wrote the documentary film and companion book about Campbell's life, The Hero's Journey. The author of more than 25 nonfiction books, and contributed to magazine publications including Parabola, and Paris magazine. Cousineau has more than 15 documentary screenwriting credits to his name, including the 1991 Academy Award-nominated Forever Activists.

His best known works include Soul: An Archaeology, Readings from Socrates to Ray Charles, which Los Angeles Times columnist Jonathan Kirsch reviewed as "Inspiring, often mind-blowing, sometimes even a little scary,"  and the best-selling book, The Art of Pilgrimage: The Seeker's Guide the Making Travel Sacred.

Cousineau worked with religion scholar Huston Smith on three books as well as four documentary films on contemporary Native American issues. His books have been translated into nine languages.

Cousineau is the host and co-writer of the Link TV television series, Global Spirit, interviewing guests such as Robert Thurman, Karen Armstrong, Andrew Harvey, Deepak Chopra, and Joanne Shenandoah. The first season of Global Spirit was presented by John Cleese and broadcast on PBS-TV stations nationwide in the United States in 2012 and 2013.

A self-avowed night owl, Cousineau published Burning the Midnight Oil, a book of essays and poems about finding inspiration in the night, in 2013.

Filmography

Bibliography

References

External links

American male screenwriters
American people of French-Canadian descent
1952 births
Living people
University of Detroit Mercy alumni
American non-fiction writers
American spiritual writers
Writers from San Francisco
Independent scholars
American male non-fiction writers
Screenwriters from California